Doliopsis is a genus of tunicates belonging to the family Doliopsidae.

Species:

Doliopsis bahamensis 
Doliopsis rubescens

References

Tunicates